Wrathchild (sometimes known as Wrathchild UK in the United States due to a naming conflict with Wrathchild America) are an English glam metal band. Formed in 1980, the group was an early band of the glam metal genre, starting off about the same time as bands of the genre such as Mötley Crüe.

In their home country, the band's speciality was in its D.I.Y. aesthetic (common for many NWOBHM bands), over the top stage shows, and striking image. During their early days, they would often play in pubs but still used confetti, pyrotechnics, and dressed in full glam metal gear, including their trademark platform boots and huge, teased hair. The band has gone through several line up changes over the year's with line up number 2 consisting of Rocky Shades, Lance Rocket, Marc Angel and Eddie Starr being considered the classic line up of the band. Bass player Marc Angel is the only consistent member having featured in every line up of the band except for the most recent line up which only features original vocalist Rocky Shades.

History
Wrathchild was formed in November 1980 in Evesham, Worcestershire, by Marc Angel and Philip Vokins. They recruited Rocky Shades for lead vocals, and Brian Parry on drums. Phil Vokins left in 1981 to join Bill Ward (Black Sabbath) in America with the new band Max Havoc, and Brian Parry also left.

The band added two members from the band Medusa; guitarist Lance Rocket and drummer Eddie Star, who became mainstays in the band and completed the line-up for a decade of touring and recording.

After releasing a string of demos, such as Mascara Massacre in 1982, the band was offered a record deal by Bullet Records. On this label the group put out their first official release in 1983, an EP called Stackheel Strutt. In 1984, the band recorded and released their debut studio album, Stakk Attakk. It would spawn two singles; a cover version of the Gary Glitter classic "Doing Alright with the Boys" and "Trash Queen".

Just as Wrathchild became successful, they came embroiled in contractual problems with their label, Heavy Metal Records. RCA Records, a major label, unsuccessfully attempted to sign the band from Heavy Metal Records in an effort to free them from their contract. Meanwhile, the group released a video compilation called War Machine in 1984.

After settling the dispute with Heavy Metal Records, nearly four years later, the band released their second album, The Biz Suxx, in 1988. The album spawned a single, "Nukklear Rokket", which had a promotional video that was produced by Bruce Dickinson of Iron Maiden. Dickinson played the protester in the video whilst the performance was filmed in the car park at his home in Chiswick. Ron Kennedy directed and edited the video as well as appearing as the mad professor. Steve Prior was the cameraman.

The band's third and final studio album, Delirium, was released shortly after in 1989. It featured Grim Reaper's Steve Grimmet on backing vocals. Soon after the release Rocky Shades left to join the punk band Discharge and with the onset of grunge, Wrathchild broke up.

Wrathchild & Psychowrath
Marc Angel, Eddie Star, and Phil Vokins, with new singer Gaz Harris started a band in 2005 called Psychowrath. In 2009, they acquired the trademarks for Wrathchild & Wrathchild UK and reverted the name Wrathchild and released Stakkattakktwo on 23 August 2011 from Perris Records.

Marc Angel explained in an interview how important the name "Wrathchild" is for them: "I spent my entire youth putting together and propagating the band known the world over as the mighty 'Wrathchild'. Wrathchild as a collective is unique, we forged an entire new glam-metal scene borne of mine and Eddie (Star's) punk roots".

Stakkattakktwo was voted the Best Album of 2011 by both Grande-Rock.com and the site's Readers' Poll.

In August 2013, Gaz Harris and Wrathchild parted ways, Gaz joined Gypsy Pistoleros. This in turn once again lead to Wrathchild splitting up.

Rocky Shades Wrathchild
Rocky Shades Wrathchild, also known as R.S.W., was founded by former lead vocalist Rocky Shades in 2006. They recorded the demo Dead Good which was featured on their Myspace website for a short time. The line-up included Rocky Shades, Jon Sudbury and James Crofts. They were set to play the Hard Rock Hell III festival in December 2009, but were removed from the bill in October; reason as quoted by Hard Rock Hell promoters "All involved in Hard Rock Hell felt that without being able to use the name to advertise, and without more than one member of the original line-up in the band, what we were left with was simply not what we booked. It’s as if we had booked Genesis and got Phil Collins. Hence it was not a proper booking, to which the agent who booked it agreed to."

Wildside Riot
In December 2010, Rocky Shades decided to start afresh by creating a new band with no relation to the Wrathchild name, Wildside Riot. The initial line-up was Rocky Shades on vocals, Gaz Wilde (Gary Hunt) on drums, Iggie Pistolero and Rob D'Var on guitars. Natt Kid took on bass duties initially, eventually replaced by James Crofts (previously of Rocky Shades Wrathchild). The present line-up is Shades and Wilde, with Joss Riot and Jimmy Gunn on guitars, and Marty Mayhem on bass.

Wildside Riot was launched in July 2011, and played a handful of UK dates from May until July 2012 promoting the new outfit. Their debut album, No Second Take, was released 28 January 2013 on CD and as a digital download. The band released a video to their self-titled track "Wildside Riot" ahead of the album which can be seen on the website. Among several other promotional gigs in late 2012 and early 2013, they also secured a Saturday slot at Hard Rock Hell VI in December 2012.

The New Wrathchild 2023-Present

In late 2019 Rocky Shades began performing again under the Rocky Shades Wrathchild name. In March 2023 it was announced after year's of battling over the Wrathchild name between current and former Wrathchild band members the name Wrathchild was finally being returned to it's co creator Rocky Shades.In a statement it was stated "Rocky Shades Wrathchild will now be officially known as “Wrathchild” since the ownership of the much disputed and controversial trademark and legacy has been returned to its co creator and motormouth frontman Rocky Shades.
The new Wrathchild is the 5 piece band that should have been since day 1 and is considerably heavier than its older incarnation. The original members have either retired or turned their back on the genre" The band are working on new material with a new single imminent entitled "Still Here In The Freak Show" and a re-recording of fan favourite "Trash Queen" this will be the first time vocalist Rocky Shades has performed on a Wrathchild release since the 1989 third studio album Delirium. It will also be the first new Wrathchild material since the 2011 fourth studio album STAKKATTAKKTWO which featured Gaz "Psychowrath" Harris on vocals, Phil  Vokins on guitar, Marc Angel on bass and Eddie Star on drums.

Members

Current Members
 Rocky Shades - vocals (1980-1990, 2023-present)
 Oz Paul - guitars (2023-present)
 Brett Patrucci - guitars (2023-present)
 Jonny Suicide - bass (2023-present)
 Gaz Wilde - drums (2023-present)

Past Members
 Brian Parry - drums (1980-1981)
 Phil Wrathchild - guitars, backing vocals (1980-1981, 2005-2013)
 Marc Angel - bass, backing vocals (1980-1990, 2005-2013)
 Lance Rocket - guitars, backing vocals (1981-1990)
 Eddie Star - drums (1981-1990, 2005-2013)
 Gaz Psychowrath - vocals (2005-2013)

Line-ups

Discography

Albums
 Stakk Attakk (1984)
 Trash Queens (1985)
 The Biz Suxx (1988)
 Delirium (1989)
 Stakkattakktwo (2011)

EPs
 Stackheel Strutt (1983)

Singles
 "Do You Want My Love?" (1982)
 "Alrite with the Boyz" (1984)
 "Trash Queen" (1984)
 "Nukklear Rokket" (1988)

Demos
 Mascara Massacre (1982)

Video albums
 Live in London/War Machine (1984)

See also
List of new wave of British heavy metal bands

References

External links
 
 Wrathchild at NWOBHM.com

1980 establishments in England
English glam metal musical groups
English heavy metal musical groups
English glam rock groups
English hard rock musical groups
Musical groups established in 1980
Musical groups disestablished in 1989
Musical groups reestablished in 2023
Musical quintets
New Wave of British Heavy Metal musical groups